Testament: The Bible in Animation is a 1996 Welsh-Russian Christian animated series that was produced by and shown on Sianel 4 Cymru (S4C). It was also shown on the BBC. It featured animated versions of stories from the Bible, each story using its own unique style of animation, including stop-motion animation. It ran for one series of nine episodes in the United Kingdom and won one Emmy, with three nominations, in the United States. It includes the song "Adiemus" as its intro.

The show was produced by Christmas Films and S4C, who also created the 1992-1994 series Shakespeare: The Animated Tales and the 2000 film The Miracle Maker, sharing many of the same voice talents and styles of animation.

Series overview

Episodes

Voice cast

 Joss Ackland − Noah, Samuel
 John Alderton − Jonah
 Roger Allam - Chief Magus
 Adjoa Andoh − Ruth
 Oona Beeson − Ishmael
 Deborah Berlin − Isaac
 Patrick Brennan − Narrator, Lot, Japhet
 David Burke − God
 Simon Callow − Merneptah
 Anna Carteret − Miriam
 Terry Dauncey − Shaphat
 Alan Dobie − Saul
 Rebecca Egan − Lady Potiphar
 Philip Franks − Daniel
 Hannah Gordon − Narrator
 Emma Gregory − Atarah
 Christopher Guard − Jonathan
 Helen Gwyn − Hagar
 Robert Hardy − Abraham
 Robert Harper − Adam, Young Joseph
 Simon Harris − Shem
 Ciarán Hinds − Satan (Lucifer)
 Steve Hodson − Nebuchadnezzar
 David Holt − Michael
 Kelly Hunter − Eve
 Gerald James − Jacob
 Martin Jarvis − Moses
 Siriol Jenkins − Orpah
 Iestyn Jones − Elisha
 Hakeem Kae-Kazim − Ham
 Polly Kemp − Michal
 Rob Lane − Reuben
 Jane Lapotaire − Sarah
 Tony Leader − Aaron, Rameses, Eliab
 Anton Lesser − Joseph
 Simon Ludders − Simeon
 Doreen Mantle − Naomi
 John McAndrew − Benjamin
 Colin McFarlane − God, Goliath
 Paul McGann − David
 T. P. McKenna − God
 Ian McNeice − Ahab
 Clive Merrison − Darius
 Bill Nighy − Belshazzar
 Richard O'Callaghan − Judah
 Carolyn Pickles − Narrator
 Christine Pritchard − Witch of Endor
 Sue Roderick − Naamah
 Ivor Roberts − Jethro
 Clive Russell − Boaz
 David Schofield − Elijah
 Bryn Terfel - Elijah (vocal soloist)
 Mark Straker − Angel
 Jonathan Tafler − Levi, Pharaoh
 Stephen Thorne − King of Nineveh
 Philip Voss − Lord Potiphar
 Victoria Wicks − Jezebel

Broadcast UK history 
BBC2 (16 October 1996 – 11 December 1996, 6 January 1997 – 13 May 1997; repeated from 1998-2006 as part of BBC2's BBC Schools daytime strand also repeated occasionally as part of the BBC Learning Zone in 2001, 2003, 2004 and 2006) 
 
S4C (11 October 1996 – 6 December 1996; in Welsh, as Testament: Y Beibl Wedi'i Animeiddio)

References

External links

1996 British television series debuts
1996 British television series endings
1990s British animated television series
S4C original programming
British children's animated drama television series
British television miniseries
Christian animation
Welsh-language television shows
English-language television shows
1990s Welsh television series
Television series based on the Bible
Children's education television series